The New Power Party (NPP) is a political party in Taiwan formed in early 2015. The party emerged from the Sunflower Student Movement in 2014, and advocates for universal human rights, civil and political liberties, as well as Taiwan independence/nationalism.  The party is a part of the political phenomenon known as the "Third Force", in which new political parties, unaligned with traditional Pan-Green or Pan-Blue Coalitions, sought to provide an alternative in Taiwanese politics. Nevertheless, the NPP's policies are very much aligned with and closely match the Pan-Green camp; thus the NPP cooperated with the Democratic Progressive Party (DPP) against the Kuomintang (KMT) in the 2016 elections, going as far as not to run in traditional KMT strongholds to avoid competition with the DPP. The party works in tandem with a perceived generational shift towards Taiwan-centrism as the new socio-cultural norm.

The party was started by Freddy Lim, lead vocalist of Taiwanese heavy metal band Chthonic, veteran activist Michael Lin,  human rights lawyers , Chiu Hsien-chih, and other prominent figures of the Sunflower Student Movement. Lim headed the party-building process, which saw the inclusion of Hung Tzu-yung, sister of the late Hung Chung-chiu, environmental lawyer , and author-activist Neil Peng into the party. On 12 September 2015, the NPP was officially formed with the election of Huang Kuo-chang as executive leader, heading a leadership team of six deputy leaders.

The NPP won five legislative seats in the 2016 Taiwanese legislative election, three from constituency and two from party-list votes, beating out long-time third party People First Party. However, two of its legislators left the party in 2019. In the 2020 Taiwanese legislative election, NPP won three party-list seats.

Platform
The NPP aims to rewrite the Constitution of the Republic of China. The constitution operates under the assumption that the Republic governs all of China (including mainland China, which the ROC has not governed since 1949), to just refer to Taiwan.

The NPP supports the legalization of same-sex marriage and is generally in favor of abolition of capital punishment.  The NPP also takes a more left wing stance compared to the DPP on labor and welfare.

History
The party was established on 25 January 2015.
In the 2016 Taiwan legislative election, the first contested by the party, the NPP won five seats in the Legislative Yuan, making it the third largest party in the Ninth Legislative Yuan. Three of the candidates gained constituency seats and two were elected through the party list. Freddy Lim and Hung Tzu-yung left the NPP in August 2019, though both remained independent members of the Ninth Legislative Yuan and chose to align with the DPP. That same month, NPP legislator Kawlo Iyun Pacidal was suspended from the party. Kawlo, a party-list legislator, was replaced by Jang Show-ling in September 2019.

In the 2020 Taiwan legislative election, the New Power Party won three party list seats, which elected Chen Jiau-hua, Chiu Hsien-chih, and Claire Wang as legislators of the Tenth Legislative Yuan.

Leadership

Secretary-General
 Chen Hui-min (25 January 2015 – 1 March 2019)
 Chen Meng-hsiu (1 March 2019 – 30 August 2019)
 Wu Pei-yun (30 August 2019 – 1 March 2020)
 Chen Chih-ming (1 March 2020 – 29 August 2020)
 Kao Yu-ting (16 September 2020 – 17 November 2020)
Bai Ching-feng (since 17 November 2020)

Legislative Yuan leader (caucus leader)
 Hsu Yung-ming (1 February 2016 – 10 September 2019)
 Huang Kuo-chang (10 September 2019 – 31 January 2020)
 Chiu Hsien-chih (since 1 February 2020)

Election results

Legislative elections

Local elections

The New Power Party fielded 40 candidates for city and county councils across Taiwan in the local elections of November 2018. Sixteen NPP candidates for local office won.

The party nominated candidates for mayor and magisterial posts for the first time prior to the 2022 local elections.

See also
 Pan-Blue Coalition
 Pan-Green Coalition
 Pan-Purple Coalition
 List of political parties in Taiwan
 Politics of the Republic of China
 Formosa Alliance

Notes

References

External links

  New Power Party on Facebook 
 Official website (In Traditional Chinese)

 
Social democratic parties in Taiwan
Centre-left parties in Asia
Formosa Alliance